Paul Haarhuis and Jacco Eltingh were the defending champions, but lost in the quarterfinals to Diego Nargiso and Udo Riglewski.

Daniel Orsanic and Jan Siemerink won the title by defeating David Adams and Andrei Olhovskiy 6–4, 6–2 in the final.

Seeds

Draw

Draw

References

External links
 Official results archive (ATP)
 Official results archive (ITF)

Doubles